Events in the year 1948 in Portugal.

Incumbents
President: Óscar Carmona
Prime Minister: António de Oliveira Salazar

Events

Arts and entertainment
March – The Jazz club Hot Club of Portugal established

Sports
CD Operário founded
A.D. Lousada founded
C.D. Montijo founded
C.D. Pinhalnovense founded
C.D. Portosantense founded

Births

10 January – Moisés Matias de Andrade, footballer (d. 2008)
17 January  – Alfredo Murça, footballer (d. 2007)
29 March – Fernando Tordo, singer and composer
31 May – João de Abreu, fencer.
25 June – Manuel Bento, footballer (d. 2007)
25 July – Carlos Silva Valente, footballer
4 August – Braulio Barbosa de Lima, footballer
11 August – António Taí, footballer
21 October – Francisco Mário, footballer
30 October – Ilda Figueiredo, politician
2 November – Manuel Carvalho da Silva, sociologist
6 November – Quinito, footballer
23 November – Leonor Beleza, politician

Full date missing
Julião Sarmento, painter and multimedia artist

Deaths
15 December – João Tamagnini Barbosa, military officer and politician (born 1883)

References

 
1940s in Portugal
Portugal
Years of the 20th century in Portugal
Portugal